Leslie George James (3 May 1933 – 26 March 2014) was an English amateur footballer who played as an outside left in the Football League for Darlington. He joined Darlington from Kington Town in May 1953, made his senior debut on the opening day of the 1953–54 season, in a 1–1 draw away to Chesterfield, and played in the next three Third Division North matches.

References

1933 births
2014 deaths
Sportspeople from Hereford
English footballers
Association football wingers
Kington Town F.C. players
Darlington F.C. players
English Football League players